The Rajasthan Youth Congress or Rajasthan Pradesh Youth Congress is the state wing of the Indian Youth Congress, youth wing of Indian National Congress. Dungarpur MLA Ganesh Ghogra is the President of Rajasthan Pradesh Youth Congress. Yashveer shoora Satyaveer Aloriya, Amardeen Fakir, Rakesh Meena and Sanjita Sihag is vice president of Rajasthan Youth Congress. Ramesh Singh Meghwal is the State Coordinator of Rajasthan Youth Congress Media Department. State Youth Congress has currently 15 state General Secretaries and there are 40+ secretaries. RPYC has 38 district units and 200 Assembly units of the organisation.

References

External links
 iyc.in

Politics of Rajasthan